Franz Schubert's compositions of 1810 are mostly in the Deutsch catalogue (D) range D 1–1C, and include:
 Instrumental works:
 Fantasy in G major for piano four-hands, D 1
 Vocal music:
 Song in C minor, D 1A

Table

Legend

List

|-
| data-sort-value="001" | 1
| data-sort-value="001" | 1
| data-sort-value="XXX,1888" | (1888)
| data-sort-value="0903,030" | IX, 3No. 30
| data-sort-value="711,01" | VII/1, 1 No. 1 & Anh. No. 1
| data-sort-value="Fantasy, D 001" | Fantasy, D 1
| data-sort-value="key G major" | G major
| data-sort-value="1810-05-01" | 8/4/1810–1/5/1810
| For piano duet; Two versions of Finale
|-
| data-sort-value="999.00011" |
| data-sort-value="001.1" | 1A
| data-sort-value="XXX,1969" | (1969)
| data-sort-value="ZZZZ" |
| data-sort-value="406,A1" | IV, 6Anh. No. 1
| data-sort-value="Song, D 001A" | Song, D 1A
| data-sort-value="key C minor" | C minor
| data-sort-value="1809-01-01" | before1810?
| For b and piano; Sketch; Music partly reused in 
|-
| data-sort-value="999.00012" |
| data-sort-value="001.2" | 1B
| data-sort-value="ZZZZ" |
| data-sort-value="ZZZZ" |
| data-sort-value="711,A2" | VII/1, 1 Anh. No. 2
| data-sort-value="Fantasy, D 001B" | Fantasy, D 1B
| data-sort-value="key G major" | G major
| data-sort-value="1810-01-01" | 1810–1811
|-
| data-sort-value="999.00013" |
| data-sort-value="001.3" | 1C
| data-sort-value="ZZZZ" |
| data-sort-value="ZZZZ" |
| data-sort-value="711,A3" | VII/1, 1 Anh. No. 3
| data-sort-value="Sonata, D 001C" | Sonata, D 1C
| data-sort-value="key F major" | F major
| data-sort-value="1810-01-01" | 1810–1811
| For piano duet; Largo (fragment)
|}

Lists of compositions by Franz Schubert
Compositions by Franz Schubert
Schubert